Colourpoint or colorpoint (occasionally colour point, color-point, etc.) may refer to:

 Point coloration of an animal's coat (fur)
 Colourpoint, the World Cat Federation name for a breed classification encompassing both of what other registries consider two separate breeds, for example:
 the Himalayan cat
 the Javanese cat
 Colorpoint Shorthair, a cat breed recognised by the Cat Fanciers' Association and some others, a Siamese cat with non-traditional colouration; the spelling "Colourpoint Shorthair" is usually not used
 Colourpoint [or Colorpoint] Longhair, a cat breed term with multiple meanings
 Lower-case: colourpoint cat, colourpoint rabbit, etc. – any animal with point colouration
 Colourpoint Books, a book publisher based in Northern Ireland